Zeballos may refer to:

Places

Vancouver Island, Canada
 Zeballos, British Columbia, a village
 Zeballos Water Aerodrome, an aerodrome
 Zeballos Inlet, an inlet
 Zeballos River
 Zeballos Peak, a mountain
 Zeballos Lake

People with the surname
 Estanislao Zeballos (1854–1923), Argentine politician
 Federico Zeballos (born 1988), Bolivian tennis player
 Fernando de Zeballos (1732–1802), Spanish priest and theologian
 Horacio Zeballos (born 1985), Argentine tennis player
 Pablo Zeballos (born 1986), Paraguayan soccer player
 Washington Zeballos, Peruvian politician

See also
 Zeballos Cué, a barrio in Asunción, Paraguay
 Ceballos